The former spa hotel Ludwigsbad in Bad Aibling was Bavaria’s first peat pulp spa and the world’s first saline peat pulp health resort. Its origins date back to a "Soolen- und Moorschlamm-Badeanstalt" founded by the royal Bavarian court physician Desiderius Beck in 1845.

History

19th century
In the middle of the 19th century, the spa was the centre of Bad Aibling's health resort business. Despite this, it got into economic difficulties, which were solved when the spa was taken over by the entrepreneur Karl von Berüff.

20th century
After the owner's family had contracted debts and made default in payments, the Ludwigsbad had to be put up for compulsory sale in 1902. The entrepreneur and financier Ludwig Meggendorfer acquired the long-standing estate. Extensive reconstruction introduced a then very advanced equipment including a steam heating system, electrical light baths, hydro-electric baths and shower rooms. Under the control of the engineer von Hößle a modern spa house was erected, which featured an automatic peat pulp conditioning plant. This installation according to the "Meggendorfer-System" was able to optimise both the consistency of the mud and to disinfect it.

21st century

References

External links

 Article on the Ludwigsbad in the official history of the city of Bad Aibling (in German)

Bad Aibling
buildings and structures destroyed by arson
defunct hotels in Germany
hotels established in 1845